The Milwaukee Wave United was an American professional soccer team, which last played in the A-League, the American second division.

The Wave United was formed and joined the A-League after the Milwaukee Rampage folded in 2002. The team announced that it would withdraw from the A-League on November 9, 2004, and play an exhibition schedule starting in 2005.

The Wave United were affiliated with the Milwaukee Wave, an indoor team.

Notable players

 Sam Sloma (born 1982), English football player

Year-by-year

References

Sports in Milwaukee
Defunct soccer clubs in Wisconsin
A-League (1995–2004) teams
2003 establishments in Wisconsin
2004 disestablishments in Wisconsin
Soccer clubs in Wisconsin
Association football clubs established in 2003
Association football clubs disestablished in 2004
Milwaukee Wave